The 2019 AFC Cup Final was the final match of the 2019 AFC Cup, the 16th edition of the AFC Cup, Asia's secondary club football tournament organized by the Asian Football Confederation (AFC).

The final was contested as a single match between April 25 from North Korea and Al-Ahed from Lebanon. The match was played at the Kuala Lumpur Stadium in Kuala Lumpur on 4 November 2019.

Al-Ahed won 1–0 by a goal from Ghanaian player Issah Yakubu. This was Al-Ahed's first continental title, as well as the first for a Lebanese team. April 25 became the first North Korean men's football club to qualify for an Asian final, while Al-Ahed were the third Lebanese side to do so (after Nejmeh in 2005 and Safa in 2008).

Teams

Venue

The match was originally to be hosted by April 25 at the Kim Il-sung Stadium in Pyongyang, North Korea on 2 November 2019. However, on 22 October 2019, due to North Korea's decision to ban television transmission of football games, the AFC announced that the final would be held in Shanghai, China in order for the match to be transmitted. On 25 October 2019, the match was rescheduled from 2 November to 4 November and the host city was shifted from Shanghai to Kuala Lumpur, Malaysia.

Road to the final

Note: In all results below, the score of the finalist is given first (H: home; A: away).

Format
The final was played as a single match, with the host team (winners of the Inter-zone play-off final) alternated from the previous season's final.

Should it tied after regulation time, extra time and, if necessary, penalty shoot-out would have been used to decide the winning team.

Match

Details

See also
2019 AFC Champions League Final

References

External links
, the-AFC.com
AFC Cup 2019, stats.the-AFC.com

AFC Cup finals
Final
November 2019 sports events in Asia
International club association football competitions hosted by Malaysia